Charles Bowden (born 1945) is an American non-fiction author, journalist, and essayist.

Charles Bowden may also refer to:
 Charles Bowden (cricketer) (1860–1909), New Zealand cricketer
 Charles Bowden (criminal), first person to enter Irelands's witness protection programme
 Charles Bowden (politician) (1886–1972), New Zealand politician
 Charles L. Bowden, mayor of Macon, Georgia from 1938 to 1947 and the namesake of the Charles L. Bowden Golf Course
 Charles Sanderson, Baron Sanderson of Bowden (born 1933), British Conservative Party politician and a life peer in the House of Lords